Andrew Ornoch (born 21 August 1985 in Warsaw) is a Polish-born Canadian former professional footballer who played in the Canadian Professional Soccer League, Nemzeti Bajnokság I, Danish Superliga, Eredivisie, Eerste Divisie, Canadian Soccer League.

Club career

Early years

He attended St. John Fisher Catholic elementary school and Pope John Paul II Catholic Secondary School in Scarborough, Ontario. As a midfielder he began playing football for the renowned North Scarborough Soccer Club, known for producing international players such as Julián de Guzmán formerly of Deportivo de La Coruña, Jonathan de Guzmán of Feyenoord, Atiba Hutchinson of F.C. Copenhagen and Dave Simpson of Sparta Prague. From there he went on to Erin Mills Soccer Club, one of Canada's leading clubs that also produced players such as Dave Simpson. After which he earned an Athletic Scholarship to the University of Detroit Mercy where he was named Horizon League player of the year and offensive player of the year in 2005 on the way to leading the team to its first ever Horizon League Championship. He is the 4th All-Time top scorer in the History of University of Detroit Mercy. Ornoch began his professional career with a brief stint with the Mississauga Olympians in the Canadian Professional Soccer League in 2002. He made his debut for the club on 4 October 2002 against the Vaughan Sun Devils coming on as a substitute for Darren Tilley.

Lombard-Pápa
In the spring of 2006 Andrew Ornoch departed from school a year early in order to play professional soccer in the Borsodi liga, the top division in Hungary. Soon after Andrew joined Lombard-Pápa TFC, where compatriot Dave Simpson also played, the team was relegated due to financial issues. He stayed with Pápa a full season at the Hungarian 2nd level but left them halfway his 2nd season.

Esbjerg
In 2008 Andrew went on to sign a 4-year contract with Esbjerg fB in the Danish Superliga where he joined fellow Canadians Atiba Hutchinson of Copenhagen and Issey Nakajima-Farran of Nordsjælland.

Heracles Almelo
On 30 August 2009 he joined Dutch club Heracles Almelo, a former club of another fellow countryman, Rob Friend. On 26 August 2010, Ornoch joined Dutch Jupiler League club BV Veendam and scored his first goal in his second appearance versus Emmen on 3 September 2010. It was heavily rumoured that Ornoch was set to sign for Toronto FC of Major League Soccer prior to the 2011 season. However, in late January it was released that the deal fell through due to Aron Winter, the coaches lack of interest. Several sources say that Ornoch was upset by the decision, claiming that TFC advised him to buy himself out of his contract in Europe before pulling an implied offer off the table.

Return To Europe, SC Telstar
After a brief stint in the Canadian Soccer League with Mississauga Eagles FC Ornoch returned to the Netherlands to play in the Eerste Divisie with Telstar. He made his debut for the team on 5 August 2011 against FC Dordrecht scoring one goal, the game ended in a 3–0 victory for Telstar.

International career
Ornoch made his debut for Canada in a November 2006 friendly match against Hungary, the country where he then played his club football. By December 2009, he earned a total of 3 caps, all as a sub, scoring no goals. He has so far represented Canada in 1 FIFA World Cup qualification match.

Dutch Connections FC
Ornoch founded a football camp for youth along with Jörg van Nieuwenhuijzen to help kids in Canada improve their skills using a Dutch approach. Dutch Connections FC offers the best player from each camp a trial with a professional club in the Netherlands. Van Nieuwenhuijzen and Ornoch played together for Heracles Almelo.

References

External links

1985 births
Living people
Footballers from Warsaw
Polish emigrants to Canada
Naturalized citizens of Canada
Association football midfielders
Canadian soccer players
Canada men's international soccer players
Canadian expatriate soccer players
Canadian expatriate sportspeople in the United States
Canadian expatriate sportspeople in Hungary
Canadian expatriate sportspeople in Denmark
Canadian expatriate sportspeople in the Netherlands
Canadian Soccer League (1998–present) players
Polish footballers
Polish expatriate footballers
Polish expatriate sportspeople in the United States
Polish expatriate sportspeople in Hungary
Polish expatriate sportspeople in Denmark
Polish expatriate sportspeople in the Netherlands
Toronto (Mississauga) Olympians players
Lombard-Pápa TFC footballers
Esbjerg fB players
Heracles Almelo players
SC Veendam players
SC Telstar players
Danish Superliga players
Eredivisie players
League1 Ontario players
Expatriate soccer players in the United States
Expatriate footballers in Hungary
Expatriate men's footballers in Denmark
Expatriate footballers in the Netherlands
Detroit Mercy Titans men's soccer players
Mississauga Eagles FC players
Vaughan Azzurri players